Lakes are bodies of water.

Lakes may also refer to:

Places
 Lakes (state), one of the ten states of South Sudan
 Lakes, Alaska, a place near Anchorage
 Lakes, Cumbria, a civil parish

Other
 Lakes (band), American indie rock band
 Lakes (restaurant), a former Michelin starred restaurant in the Netherlands
 The Sinixt or Lakes tribe, Native Americans in Washington state and the Kootenay region of British Columbia

See also
 Lake (disambiguation)
 Lake District, also commonly known as "the Lakes", an area of NW England
 Lakes Region (New Hampshire)
 The Lakes (disambiguation)